Acrolepiopsis is a genus of  moths in the family Acrolepiidae.

Species
The following species are classified:

 Acrolepiopsis assectella Zeller, 1839
 Acrolepiopsis betulella Curtis, 1838
 Acrolepiopsis brevipennella (Moriuti, 1972)
 Acrolepiopsis californica Gaedike, 1984
 Acrolepiopsis chirapanthui (Moriuti, 1984)
 Acrolepiopsis clavivalvatella Moriuti, 1972
 Acrolepiopsis delta (Moriuti, 1961)
 Acrolepiopsis deltoides Gaedike, 1971
 Acrolepiopsis halosticta (Meyrick, 1914)
 Acrolepiopsis heppneri Gaedike, 1984
 Acrolepiopsis incertella (Chambers, 1872)
 Acrolepiopsis infundibulosa Gaedike & Karsholt, 2001
 Acrolepiopsis issikiella (Moriuti, 1961)
 Acrolepiopsis japonica Gaedike, 1982
 Acrolepiopsis kostjuki Budashkin, 1998
 Acrolepiopsis leucoscia (Meyrick, 1927)
 Acrolepiopsis marcidella Curtis, 1850
 Acrolepiopsis mauli Gaedike & Karsholt, 2001
 Acrolepiopsis nagaimo Yasuda, 2000
 Acrolepiopsis orchidophaga Moriuti, 1982
 Acrolepiopsis persimilis Moriuti, 1974
 Acrolepiopsis peterseni Gaedike, 1994
 Acrolepiopsis postomacula (Matsumura, 1931)
 Acrolepiopsis reticulosa (Braun, 1927)
 Acrolepiopsis sapporensis Matsumura, 1931
 Acrolepiopsis sinense Gaedike, 1971
 Acrolepiopsis sinjovi Gaedike, 1994
 Acrolepiopsis suzukiella (Matsumura, 1931)
 Acrolepiopsis tauricella Staudinger, 1871
 Acrolepiopsis ussurica Zagulajev, 1981
 Acrolepiopsis vesperella Zeller, 1850

References

 , 1979: Nomenklatorische Bemerkungen zu palaearktischen Acrolepiiden (Lepidoptera). Beiträge zur Entomologie 29 (2): 413–414.
 , 1986: Die typen der orientalischen, australischen und äthiopischen Acrolepiidae (Lepidoptera). Beiträge zur Entomologie 36 (1): 63–68.
 , 1988: Beitrag zur Kenntnis afrikanischer Acrolepiidae (Lepidoptera). Beiträge zur Entomologie 38 (1): 83–87.
 , 2007 (2009): Some new and interesting Microlepidoptera from the collection of the Zoologisches Forschungsmuseum Alexander Koenig (ZFMK), Bonn (Lepidoptera: Tineidae, Epermeniidae, Acrolepiidae, Douglasiidae). Bonner Zoologische Beiträge 56 (1-2): 101–106. Full article: 
  2007: Taxonomic review of the leek moth genus Acrolepiopsis (Lepidoptera: Acrolepiidae) in North America. Canadian Entomologist 139: 319–353. Full article: .

External links

Acrolepiopsis at funet

Acrolepiidae
Moth genera